Silky Curler Twink by Elida was a popular brand of home perm kit that was available in Britain in the late 1960s and 1970s, retailing for about 37 pence. It was promoted using full-page advertisements in women's magazines, such as the leading title Woman, and became a household name. Like some other such kits, its use could produce a strong odour of chemicals in the hair that some found unpleasant. The fashion for home perming subsequently ended and the brand has long since ceased being produced. However, the brand still evokes a sense of nostalgia in some who remember it from their youth and examples of its packaging can be collectors items.

The British musician and actor Twink, born John Charles Alder, is said to have taken his stage name from the product.

Elida Gibbs Limited, based in Kingston upon Thames, Surrey, England, was established in 1910 and was renamed Elida Faberge Limited in 1995.  It is now a member of the Unilever NV group of companies.

Personal care brands
Unilever brands
Hairdressing